Edward Clarke (1871 – after 1890) was an English footballer who played in the Football Alliance for Small Heath. He was born in the Stechford district of Birmingham and attended Washwood Heath School. He played once for Small Heath in the inaugural season of the Football Alliance, deputising at left back for the injured Fred Speller.

References

1871 births
Year of death missing
Footballers from Birmingham, West Midlands
English footballers
Association football fullbacks
Birmingham City F.C. players
Date of birth missing
Football Alliance players